Ally Gallacher (1909–1964) was a Scottish football manager who briefly managed Dundee United in 1957.

Career
Gallacher was manager of Tayside junior club Carnoustie Panmure when he accepted Dundee United manager Reggie Smith's offer to become assistant manager. When Smith left to join Falkirk in January 1957, Gallacher was appointed as a short-term replacement. In a seven-week spell, Gallacher oversaw a month which saw seven goals conceded in three consecutive matches within the same month. His resignation enabled him to concentrate on his other role as an employee of Taypools, which he had been instrumental in establishing. His son, Ken (1939–2003), became a leading journalist and chief football writer with The Glasgow Herald.

References

1909 births
1964 deaths
Scottish football managers
Dundee United F.C. managers
Carnoustie Panmure F.C. managers
Scottish Football League managers